Braine-le-Château is a municipality of Wallonia located in the Belgian province of  Walloon Brabant. 

On January 1, 2006, Braine-le-Château had a total population of 9,446. The total area is 22.70 km² which gives a population density of 416 inhabitants per km².

The municipality consists of the following districts: Braine-le-Château and Wauthier-Braine, which were municipalities of their own until 1977.

Braine-le-Château is a medieval village in which remain many buildings from the Middle Ages. Among them are the pillory (1521), the village mill (c. 1200) and the Maison du Bailli (c. 1535).

References

External links
 
Official website

 
Municipalities of Walloon Brabant